The 2006 Swiss Open (officially known as the Wilson Swiss Open 2006  for sponsorship reasons) was badminton tournament which took place at the St. Jakobshalle in Basel, Switzerland, on from 3 to 8 January 2006 and had a total purse of $120,000.

Tournament 
The 2006 Swiss Open was the first tournament of the 2006 IBF World Grand Prix and also part of the Swiss Open championships, which had been held since 1955.

Venue 
This international tournament was held at St. Jakobshalle in Basel, Switzerland.

Point distribution 
Below is the point distribution table for each phase of the tournament based on the IBF points system for the IBF World Grand Prix 4-star event.

Prize pool 
The total prize money for this tournament was US$120,000. The distribution of the prize money was in accordance with IBF regulations.

Men's singles

Seeds 

 Lee Chong Wei (champion)
 Peter Gade (semi-finals)
 Muhammad Hafiz Hashim (second round)
 Lee Hyun-il (quarter-finals)
 Wong Choong Hann (semi-finals)
 Kuan Beng Hong (quarter-finals)
 Shon Seung-mo (quarter-finals)
 Niels Christian Kaldau (quarter-finals)
 Sairul Amar Ayob (third round)
 Park Sung-hwan (third round)
 Dicky Palyama (second round)
 Eric Pang (second round)
 Geoff Bellingham (first round)
 Przemysław Wacha (second round)
 Björn Joppien (first round)
 Bobby Milroy (second round)

Finals

Top half

Section 1

Section 2

Bottom half

Section 3

Section 4

Women's singles

Seeds 

 Pi Hongyan (semi-finals)
 Huaiwen Xu (champion)
 Yao Jie (withdrew)
 Mia Audina (semi-finals)
 Juliane Schenk (quarter-finals)
 Seo Yoon-hee (quarter-finals)
 Wong Mew Choo (second round)
 Tracey Hallam (first round)

Finals

Top half

Section 1

Section 2

Bottom half

Section 3

Section 4

Men's doubles

Seeds 

 Mathias Boe / Carsten Mogensen (final)
 Chan Chong Ming / Koo Kien Keat (champions)
 Mohd Zakry Abdul Latif / Gan Teik Chai (first round)
 Michał Łogosz / Robert Mateusiak (quarter-finals)
 Robert Lin Woon Fui / Mohd Fairuzizuan Mohd Tazari (quarter-finals)
 Jonas Rasmussen / Peter Steffensen (quarter-finals)
 Ong Soon Hock / Tan Bin Shen (second round)
 Thomas Laybourn / Lars Paaske (quarter-finals)

Finals

Top half

Section 1

Section 2

Bottom half

Section 3

Section 4

Women's doubles

Seeds 

 Lee Hyo-jung / Lee Kyung-won (semi-finals)
 Gail Emms / Donna Kellogg (first round)
 Ella Tripp / Joanne Wright (first round)
 Chin Eei Hui / Wong Pei Tty (semi-finals)
 Britta Andersen / Mette Schjoldager (quarter-finals)
 Zhang Dan / Zhao Tingting (final)
 Nicole Grether / Juliane Schenk (second round)
 Cheng Wen-hsing / Chien Yu-chin (quarter-finals)

Finals

Top half

Section 1

Section 2

Bottom half

Section 3

Section 4

Mixed doubles

Seeds 

 Lee Jae-jin / Lee Hyo-jung (quarter-finals)
 Nathan Robertson / Gail Emms (champions)
 Thomas Laybourn / Kamilla Rytter Juhl (withdrew)
 Daniel Shirley / Sara Petersen (second round)
 Anthony Clark / Donna Kellogg (semi-finals)
 Robert Blair / Natalie Munt (final)
 Anggun Nugroho / Yunita Tetty (first round)
 Koo Kien Keat / Wong Pei Tty (first round)

Finals

Top half

Section 1

Section 2

Bottom half

Section 3

Section 4

References

External links 
Tournament Link
Results

2006 IBF World Grand Prix
Swiss Open (badminton)
Swiss Open
Swiss Open